Red String is a webcomic series created by Gina Biggs. Starting in 2002, this story chronicles the daily life of a Japanese high school student, Miharu Ogawa who discovers one day that she is the victim of an arranged marriage. The series premise is based on the red string of fate of Japanese and Chinese mythology. It has a definite shōjo manga influence and is primarily a romance story. The first three volumes were published by Dark Horse Comics. As of August 2013, the series has been completed.

Publication history
Red String was first printed in 2005 as a self-published work under Gina Biggs's all-female comic group, Strawberry Comics. On May 1, 2006, the author announced that Dark Horse Comics had licensed the title for publication. The first seven chapters of the series, mostly edited and touched up for print with Dark Horse Comics, were collected into Volume 1 and released on January 28, 2007. Volume 2 was released January 30, 2008, and collected chapters eight through fourteen. The third volume comprised chapters fifteen through twenty one and was released on May 8, 2008.  No further volumes will be published by Dark Horse.

The series continues to be released online for free despite its completion. In addition, a full-color art book titled Threads was released by the author in 2006.  Threads II, a follow-up artbook was released in early 2009 and is also self-published by the author.

There is also a radio play in production based on the comic. Crystal Miller of the Voice Acting Alliance initiated the project in September 2005, later passing the reigns to Biggs.  On November 7, 2006, the first chapter was released, and as of April 2008, three chapters and one supplement have been released.

The comic is a member of the Create a Comic Project.

Characters

Main teenage characters
Most of the comic focuses on the life of Miharu and her teenage friends.
 is the main character of Red String. She is a sixteen-year-old Japanese High School student with bleached-blond hair, is rather out-spoken and trendy, and is close friends with Reika and Fuuko. She is also betrothed to a stranger against her will, however she soon discovers that she and her fiancé have actually already met.
 is the male lead of Red String, he is Miharu's 19-year-old fiancé. His family has firm plans for his future which he feels trapped by. He does, however, have genuine affection for Miharu, as she does for him.
 is one of Miharu's two best friends, and Miharu and Reika have known each other since childhood. Miharu helped Reika through some tough times in middle school that left a mark on Reika's reputation (despite Reika's innocence in the matter). She had a crush on Hiroshi Aizaku and begins a relationship with him but she later finds out the playboy side of him and thus, their relationship ended. She later on realises her feelings for Eiji and they become a couple. 
 is Miharu's other best friend. She is also 16 years old, and though she only met Miharu and Reika when she began attending high school she was quickly accepted as part of the group. Her family moves often, usually due to her father's company reassigning him. She was a big fan of her school's volleyball team and was in love with Maya Chiaki, the team captain. She moves to Tokyo in Chapter 15. Side Story 2, which takes place between Chapters 16 and 27, reveals that she has joined her Tokyo school's film club and started dating Hanae Niijima, who returns her feelings.
 is a friend of Hiroshi's who is known as a "lone wolf" to most students. Initially, he does not seem to like Reika or Miharu very much, and demonstrates this with snide and piercing remarks and a rough attitude. However, he has been known to offer Miharu advice and he is a very responsible older brother. More recently he has begun to think of Miharu and Reika as friends, and a growing affection for Reika has undoubtedly been unfolding in Eiji. When Reika starts dating Aizaku, Eiji tries to talk her out of it because he knew Aizaku was cheating on her. This eventually led to a fight between him and Aizaku. Reika later on discovers Aizaku's playboy side, resulting their relationship to come to an end. Eiji and Reika get closer after the accident and they eventually become a couple when Reika returns her feelings for Eiji.

Secondary teenage characters
 is a girl in the same year as Miharu, Reika, and Fuuko. She is "the envy of all the girls in school and the desire of all the guys", and a top student to boot. However, she has a superiority complex and especially likes to pick on Miharu and her friends. Her popularity has waned somewhat lately as Maya Chiaki's has increased.
 is an attractive student in the same year as the girls. Reika has a crush on him, but he is oblivious to her feelings. He seems to be a generally nice guy, but has a bit of a womanizing streak. He is a member of the Astronomy Club, which Reika also joined to get closer to him. If he's not hanging out with one or more girls, he may be found chatting with Eiji Hayashihara. He eventually dates Reika, not because he likes her, but to steal the person that Eiji likes as he becomes more popular than himself. Although he was dating Reika, he was playing with other girls. Thus, leading to a fight between him and Eiji, following a breakup with Reika. Aizaku then finds out that he had hurt many people and apologizes to Reika and Eiji. 
 is a year older than Miharu and her friends. Makoto claims that he is Miharu's fiancé, however his appearance was actually due to a mix-up between Miharu's parents and his own. However, he was still determined to court Miharu and take over her father's restaurant - Ogawa-ya - one day, even transferring schools to get closer to Miharu (to her dismay). However, after meeting Miharu on the roof after school one day to apologize for his actions during the summer, he tells her that he will start giving 'Miss Karen' his fullest attention.
 is Miharu's older cousin. She works in Ogawa-ya as a waitress and she seems rather cold. She has been manipulative where Miharu and Kazuo were concerned, and nearly caused lasting damage to their relationship. She had been affected by painful memories.
 is the 17-year-old captain of the school volleyball team and the team's ace. She is friends with Fuuko and Karen, and also enjoys karaoke. She's also confused about her sexuality. Her father is American, so she's only half-Japanese.
 is the president of the Astronomy Club, of which Reika and Hiroshi are also members. 16-year-old Seiko loves the night sky, and aspires to be an astronomer. She (correctly) guesses that Reika is a member only because Hiroshi is and offers her some pearls of wisdom, telling her that her pictures of stars are actually quite good.
 is a classmate of Karen. He and Karen love each other, but Karen's engagement with Makoto Yosue prevents them from being together.
 is the captain of the school's baseball team. He likes Maya, and tried to support her when almost everyone else gave her the cold shoulder because of some rumors about a relation between her and Fuuko.
 attends Harusono High School and becomes Miharu's friend. She is a high class and somewhat snobby girl who grew up with Kazuo. She dislikes Tomi.
 attends Harusono University with Kazuo and works at Café Charm.
 attends Harusono High School and becomes Miharu's friend. She attends Harusono to try to get a rich husband because her family is poor. She dislikes Kikuko.

Parents
The teenagers' parents are seen and mentioned in Red String on occasion, but they are most often relegated to background characters and comic relief.
Miharu's Parents: Miharu's parents run the family business Ogawa-ya, a restaurant and sushi bar. Her aunt, uncle, and cousin Karen work there too. Her father  runs the business and cooks and her mother  is the head hostess.
Karen's Parents: Karen's parents are Miharu's Uncle , and Aunt . They work at Ogawa-ya as a chef and waitress, Jiro is the younger brother of Miharu's father and even though they aren't twins they look incredibly alike. You can tell them apart because Jiro has an ear-piercing and Miharu's father does not. Also, Miharu's dad wears glasses and Jiro does not.
Kenta works in the Fujiwara family's pharmaceutical company, and is in fact in line to inherit leadership. Kenta and Emi married quickly after finding that Emi was pregnant with Kazuo, after a whirlwind romance between his parents.

Siblings
Some of the characters have siblings who also make an appearance.
Kazuo's Sisters: Kazuo has two younger sisters, the elder of two is called , and the younger is called . When they first meet Miharu they get confused and mistake Karen for her. They are slightly disappointed when they see Miharu, but they do warm up to her.
Eiji's Brothers: Eiji has a younger brother called , and an elder brother called . All three Hayashihara brothers are rather alike.
Maya's Brother: Maya has an older brother called  who is a fashion designer. Like Maya he is half Japanese, half American.

Chapters

References

Further reading

External links
Red String website 

2000s webcomics
Anime and manga inspired webcomics
Dark Horse Comics titles
Original English-language manga
Romance webcomics
Webcomics in print
2002 webcomic debuts
2013 webcomic endings